Denis Curzi (born 14 May 1975) is an Italian male former long-distance runner who competed at individual senior level at four editions of the IAAF World Half Marathon Championships (2000, 2002, 2007, 2009).

He won Treviso Marathon in 2008.

References

External links
 

1975 births
Living people
Italian male long-distance runners
Italian male marathon runners
Athletics competitors of Centro Sportivo Carabinieri